Billy James Creech (born March 25, 1943) is a former Republican member of the North Carolina General Assembly representing the state's twenty-sixth House district, including constituents in Johnston and Wayne counties.  A businessman from Clayton, North Carolina, Creech served eight terms in the state House.

In 2002, after redistricting put Creech in the same NC House district as fellow Republican Leo Daughtry, Creech declined to run again for the NC House.  Instead, he ran for United States Congress in North Carolina's 2nd congressional district in 2004.  Creech won the Republican Primary easily, but lost the general election to incumbent congressman Bob Etheridge.

References

External links

|-

Members of the North Carolina House of Representatives
Living people
1943 births
21st-century American politicians
People from Clayton, North Carolina